Criminal Reduction Utilising Statistical History is an IBM predictive analytics system that attempts to predict the location of future crimes. It was developed as part of the Blue CRUSH program in conjunction with Memphis Police Department and the University of Memphis Criminology and Research department. In Memphis it was “credited as a key factor behind a 31 per cent fall in crime and 15 per cent drop in violent crime.”

, it was being trialed by two British police forces.

In 2014 a modified version of the system, called CRASH (Crash Reduction Analysing Statistical History) became operational in Tennessee aimed at preventing vehicle accidents.

See also 
 Crime mapping

References 

Crime mapping
Crime prevention
Criminal Reduction Utilising Statistical History
History of criminal justice
Crime statistics